Fretwork is a consort of viols based in England, United Kingdom.  Formed in 1986, the group initially consisted of six players, while it is currently five viols.  Its repertoire consists primarily of music of the Renaissance period, in particular that of Elizabethan and Jacobean England, arrangements of the music of Johann Sebastian Bach, and contemporary music written for them.

The group has toured all over the world, with tours of Japan and the United States, and three visits to Russia, the first in 1989, when it was still a part of the Soviet Union. They initiated a series of courses for voices and viols on the Greek island of Evvia with Michael Chance, and have also been invited twice to teach on the annual Conclave of the Viola da Gamba Society of America. It currently teaches each year in the first week of Dartington International Summer School.

In addition to its performances of earlier music, Fretwork has been active in commissioning new works for viol consort.  Its 1997 recording Sit Fast includes new works by such composers as Gavin Bryars, Tan Dun, and Elvis Costello. It has also commissioned music from Sir John Tavener, Michael Nyman, Alexander Goehr, George Benjamin, Duncan Druce, Fabrice Fitch, Gavin Bryars, Barry Guy, Poul Ruders, Simon Bainbridge, Ivan Moody, John Woolrich, Thea Musgrave, Peter Sculthorpe, Sally Beamish, Andrew Keeling and Orlando Gough.

Fretwork has recorded a series of discs for Virgin Classics and Harmonia Mundi USA, but currently records for Signum Records. Recent discs include 'Bach's Goldberg Variations arranged for viols by Richard Boothby and The World Encompassed, with Simon Callow.

In 2007 they recorded Birds on Fire: Jewish Music for Viols which presents some of the music composed by Italian-Jewish composers from the Bassano & Lupo families, who came to England to work at the court of Henry VIII in 1540. It also includes music by Salamone Rossi and Leonora Duarte. Finally it includes the first recording of 'Birds on Fire' itself, a three-part piece by Orlando Gough written for Fretwork in 2001.  This work is based on the novel by Aaron Appelfeld "Badenheim 1939", telling the story of a group of Jews who holiday in a resort near Vienna in the spring of 1939. The town gradually becomes a ghetto, and the band of musicians gradually rediscover their Jewish roots to break out from the Vienese schmalz to play klezmer tunes.

Their second recording of the complete Fantazias by Henry Purcell, including the two in Nomines, for HMU (Harmonia Mundi USA) was selected as Editor's Choice in Classic FM Magazine; where Fretwork's playing was described as "all one could wish for"; and it won the Gramophone Award on the Baroque Instrumental section 2009.

In 2008, they recorded two tracks on Ryuichi Sakamoto's album Out of Noise.

Fretwork was featured on the soundtracks of two Jim Jarmusch movies, Coffee and Cigarettes (2003) and Broken Flowers (2005). Other filmtracks include The Da Vinci Code, Kingdom of Heaven, The Crucible, La Fille d'Artagnant and many others. It has also recorded for Robbie Williams (Supreme) and Loreena McKennitt (for the album An Ancient Muse).

In March 2011, Richard Campbell committed suicide, losing his battle against a melancholy he had been fighting for years. His loss is keenly felt by all his colleagues.

In 2016 they celebrated their 30 years of activity with a concert in London's Kings Place, with guest players and singers, ending the concert with an arrangement of 'Because' by Lennon & McCartney.

Since 2017 they have been recording for Signum Classics, and have released three CDs on this label: The World Encompassed, In Chains of Gold and John Jenkins Four-part Consort music.

Current members
Richard Boothby *
Joanna Levine
Asako Morikawa
Sam Stadlen
Emily Ashton

(* denotes members when the group originally formed)

Former members
Julia Hodgson*
William Hunt*
Wendy Gillespie*
Susanna Pell*
Richard Campbell *
Liam Byrne
Richard Tunnicliffe
Reiko Ichise

Frequent guests
Clare Wilkinson – mezzo-soprano
Emma Kirkby – Soprano
Michael Chance – Counter-Tenor
Charles Daniels – Tenor
Jacob Heringman – Lute
The Hilliard Ensemble

Prizes and awards
1997: French Grand Prix du Disque for Lachrimae, or Seaven Teares by John Dowland
2009: Gramophone Award for 'Purcell: Complete Fantazias' (by Henry Purcell) on Harmonia Mundi
2016: Royal Philharmonic Society 'Chamber Music & Song' Award

Discography
 In Nomine – 1987 
 Heart's Ease – 1988 
 Armada – 1988 
 Cries and Fancies by Orlando Gibbons – 1989 
 Night's Black Bird by John Dowland and William Byrd – 1989 
 Goe nightly cares by John Dowland and William Byrd – 1990 
 Lachrimae by John Dowland – 1990 
 For ye Violls by William Lawes – 1991 
 Music for Viols – 1992 
 A Play of Passion – 1992 
 The English Viol – 1994 (compilation album) 
 William Byrd: The Complete Consort Music by William Byrd – 1994 
 Henry Purcell: The Fantazias and In Nomines by Henry Purcell – 1995 
 Concord is conquer'd by William Lawes – 1995 
 Matthew Locke: Consort of Fower Parts by Matthew Locke – 1996 
 The Mirrour and Wonder of his Age by John Jenkins – 1996 
 Sit Fast – 1997 
 Celestiall Witchcraft – 1999 
 Missa 'Mater Christi sanctissima''' by John Taverner – 2000 
 The Hidden Face by John Tavener and John Taverner – 2001 
 Harmonice Musices Odhecaton compiled by Ottaviano Petrucci – 2001 
 The Art of Fugue by J.S. Bach – 2002 
 Above the Starrs by Thomas Tomkins – 2003 
 Im Maien by Ludwig Senfl – 2004 
 Consort Songs by William Byrd – 2004 
 Bach: Alio Modo by Johann Sebastian Bach – 2005 
 "Agricola: Chansons" by Alexander Agricola & Fabrice Fitch – 2006 
 "Birds on Fire: Jewish Music for Viols" – music by Thomas Lupo, Orlando Gough etc. – 2008 
 "English Music for Viols" (a 5-CD set of previous recordings of works by Purcell, Lawes, Locke & Jenkins) – 2008 
 "Purcell Complete Fantazias" The fantazias & In Nomines by Henry Purcell of 1680 – 2009 
 "The Silken Tent" music by Alexander Goehr, William Byrd, Michael Nyman, Henry Purcell, Claude Debussy etc. – 2009
 "J. S. Bach: The Goldberg Variations, arranged for six viols by Richard Boothby"  – 2011
 "The World Encompassed" music by Orlando Gough, Robert Parsons, Robert White with Simon Callow, narrator – 2017
 "In Chains of Gold: Consort Anthems by Orlando Gibbons, with the Magdalena Consort & His Majesties Cornets & Sackbuts"  – 2017
 "John Jenkins Complete four-part consort music"''  – 2018

References

External links
http://www.fretwork.co.uk/

Instrumental early music groups
English classical music groups
Musical groups established in 1986

1986 establishments in England